Stylopsis is a genus of sea snails.  In other words, they are a genus of marine gastropod, gastropods being a class of mollusk.  This creature is within a particular  family of sea snail called Pyramidellidae.

Description
The shell is  subulate, opaque, smooth, and not polished. The whorls of the teleoconch are flattened. The suture is well-impressed. The aperture is subquadrangular. The columella is straight and simple. The lip is subangular in front.

Species
Species within the genus Stylopsis include:
 Stylopsis pulchellus de Folin, 1870
 Stylopsis sulcata A. Adams, 1861
 Stylopsis typica A. Adams, 1860
Taxa inquerenda
 Stylopsis marioni Locard, 1897
 Stylopsis polyskista de Folin, 1879
 Stylopsis textus de Folin, 1879

The following species were brought into synonymy:
 Stylopsis eminuta de Folin, 1878 : synonym of Pyrgiscus eminutus (de Folin, 1878)
 Stylopsis rufofasciata E.A. Smith, 1875: synonym of Derjuginella rufofasciata (E.A. Smith, 1875)
 Stylopsis resticula (Dall, 1889): synonym of Bacteridium resticulum (Dall, 1889)

References

External links
 To World Register of Marine Species

Pyramidellidae
Monotypic gastropod genera